100 Tourist Sites of Bulgaria is a Bulgarian national movement established in 1966 to promote tourism among Bulgaria's most significant cultural, historic, and natural landmarks.

As part of this program, sites of cultural and historical significance have been selected, ranging from historic places and monuments to archaeological and architectural sanctuaries, museums, monasteries, as well as national parks, mountain peaks and other geological phenomena. Each of the chosen landmarks has its own individual seal, which is stamped onto pages of an official passport-like booklet issued by the Bulgarian Tourist Union (BTU). A booklet can be purchased at any tourist union center or on location at any of the sites and it costs a symbolic 1 lev. The booklet comes with a separate map which includes a list of the sites, their addresses and working hours. The maximum number of collectible stamps per booklet is 100 and, contrary to the movement's title, the exact number of official sites exceeds the number 100.

A reward scheme has been developed to encourage collection of as many stamps as possible. Depending on the number of stamps collected, participants may receive bronze, silver or gold badges. 25 stamps earn bronze, 50 stamps earn silver and 100 stamps (a complete booklet) earn gold. The National Organizational Committee of the BTU holds an annual lottery for the previous year's badge earners every August. Prizes include domestic and overseas excursions, bicycles, tents, sleeping bags, and other travel-related items.

Some landmarks in the original program highlighted Bulgaria's Communist government, which collapsed on November 10, 1989.  In 2003 the BTU removed many of these sites from the official list. Both the original and current lists appear below. The list has since seen minor changes in 2007, 2008 and 2009.

A variety of organizations and institutions participated in developing and promoting the 100 Tourist Sites of Bulgaria.  These include: 
The Bulgarian Tourist Union
The Ministry of Education and Science of Bulgaria
The Ministry of Culture of Bulgaria
The Bulgarian State Agency for Youth and Sports
The Holy Synod of the Bulgarian Orthodox Church
The Ministry of Environment and Water of Bulgaria
The Union of Bulgarian Motorists
The Bulgarian Red Cross
The Bulgarian National Radio
Bulgarian National Television

One hundred national tourist sites

Bansko — Velyanov House, Neofit Rilski Museum, Nikola Vaptsarov Museum, Permanent Icon Exhibition "Bansko Art School",.

a Bansko- Holy Trinity Church
Pirin mountain — Vihren Peak
 Dobarsko village — Church of Theodore Tyro and Theodore Stratilates
 Melnik — Historical Museum of Melnik, Kordopulov House, 4a Rozhen Monastery.
 Petrich — Rupite Protected Area including St. Petka Church, 5a Samuil's Fortress National Park Museum, 5b Heraclea Sintica ancient Greek city.
 Nesebar —Nesebar Archaeological Museum 6a Pomorie – Salt Museum, Pomorie, 6bLake Pomorie
 Burgas – Cathedral of Saints Cyril and Methodius, Poda Protected Area, '7a Aytos rock formation "Three brothers"
 Malko Tarnovo — Petrova Niva Site, Museum of History 8a. Sozopol — Archaeological Museum
 Varna — Museum of History and the Maritime Museum
 Devnya — Museum of Mosaics
 Veliko Tarnovo — Tsarevets archaeological reserve, Museum of History, Arbanasi architectural reserve
 Svishtov — Aleko Konstantinov's House
 Vidin — Konaka Museum (Museum of History) and Baba Vida Fortress
 Magura Cave
 Belogradchik –  Museum of History, Belogradchik Rocks. (Formerly also: Belogradchik Fortress)
 Vratsa — Ledenika Cave, Regional Museum of History 16a. Mezdra (added in the 2010s) – Kaleto archaeological complex
 Mount Okolchitsa — the place of Hristo Botev's death
 Kozloduy — Radetzky steamship-museum, Monument of Hristo Botev
 Gabrovo — Etar Architectural-Ethnographic Complex, Museum of Education, Uzana locality, House of Humour and Satire
 Bozhentsi village — Architectural and historical reserve
 Tryavna — Museum of the Wood-Carving and Ethnographical Arts
 Dryanovo — Dryanovo Monastery, Kolyu Ficheto Museum, Bacho Kiro Cave
 Dobrich — House of Yordan Yovkov, Art Gallery
 Balchik — Palace complex 24a. University Botanic Garden 24b. Kavarna —  Kaliakra Headland, Kaliakra Archaeological reserve
 Kardzhali — Ruins of Perperikon, Monastery of John the Precursor (Св. Йоан Предтеча)25a. Regional Museum of History
 Kyustendil — Vladimir Dimitrov Art Gallery, House of Dimitar Peshev, Medieval Church of St George museum, regional historical museum
 Blagoevgrad (added in the 2010s) – Varosha Quarter, regional historical museum 27a. Ruen Peak in Osogovo Mountain
 Rila Monastery
 Skakavitsa Chalet and the Seven Rila Lakes
 Lovech — Vasil Levski Museum, Kakrina Inn 30a. Karlukovo (added in the 2010s) – National cave house 30b. Devetaki – Devetashka cave
 Troyan — Natural History Museum at Cherni Osam, Troyan Monastery, Museum of Folk Arts
 Teteven — Museum of History
 Brestnitsa village — Saeva Dupka Cave
 Berkovitsa — Museum of Ethnography, House of Ivan Vasov. (Formerly also: Kom Peak)
 Pazardzhik — Church of Virgin Mary, House of Stanislav Dospevski, Regional Museum of History
 Panagyurishte — Oborishte locality,  House of Rayna Knyaginya
 Peshtera — Snezhanka Cave, Peristera Fortress
 Batak — Museum of History
 Tran — the Gorge on the Jerma River 39a. Pernik (added in the 2010s) – Underground mining museum
 Pleven — St George the Conqueror Chapel Mausoleum, Pleven Panorama, Regional Museum of History
 Plovdiv — Roman theatre, Ethnography Museum, Museum of History. (Formerly also: Old Plovdiv architectural reserve, St. Konstantin and Elena Church)
 Perushtitsa — Museum of History
 Sopot — the Nunnery, House of Ivan Vazov
 Karlovo — Vasil Levski National Museum, Museum of History
 Kalofer — Hristo Botev National Museum
 Sandanski (added in the 2010s) – Episcopal Basilica, Archaeological Museum 46a.The Botev Peak
 Asenovgrad — The Bachkovo Monastery, Asenova krepost fortress, Museum of History
 Razgrad — Abrittus Archaeological reserve
 Isperih — Museum of History, Sboryanovo museum of history and archaeology, the Thracian town of Chelis and Demir Baba Tekke at Sveshtari village. (Formerly also: Thracian Tomb)
 Rousse — House of Zahari Stoyanov, Pantheon of National Revival Heroes
 Silistra — Museum of History, Medcidi Tabi fortress
 Srebarna Nature Reserve
 Tutrakan — Military Tomb Memorial Complex, Museum of Danube Fishing and Boat-Making.
 Sliven — House of Hadzhi Dimitar, National Textile Museum, Art Gallery
 Velingrad (added in the 2010s) – Museum of History. (The Sinite Kamani Natural park and Karandila Chalet previously occupied this position.)
 Kotel — Georgi Sava Rakovski's Pantheon and the Museum of Famous People of the Bulgarian Revival Age, Natural History Museum
 Zheravna village — House of Yordan Yovkov. (Formerly also: Architecture and Ethnography Reserve)
 Sofia — The National Museum of History 58a. Boyana Church National Museum
 Sofia — Alexander Nevsky Cathedral 59a. (added in the 2010s) National Museum of Military History
 Elena (added in the 2010s) – House of Hilarion of Makariopolis, Daskalolivnitsa historical complex. (The National Church Museum of History and Archaeology in Sofia previously occupied this position.)
 Sofia — Earth and Man National Museum 61a. National Palace of Culture
 Sofia — National Gallery for Foreign Art, maintained by the Bulgarian Academy of Sciences 62a. National Art Gallery
 Etropole — Museum of History, Clocktower, Monastery of the Holy Trinity
 Krestevic, Sredna Gora (added in the 2010s) — Buntovna Commemorative Tourist Complex
 Sofia — National Museum of Natural History maintained by the Bulgarian Academy of Sciences
 Sofia — Museum of the History of Sport located inside the Vasil Levski National Stadium 66a. Sofia Zoo 66b. (added in the 2010s) National Anthropological Museum maintained by the Bulgarian Academy of Sciences
 Starosel village — Thracian tomb 67a. Hisarya — Archaeological Museum
 Sofia — Institute of Archaeology and Museum maintained by the Bulgarian Academy of Sciences 68a. (added in the 2010s) National Polytechnical Museum
 Chiprovtsi (added in the 2010s) – Museum of History, Chiprovtsi Monastery
 Bratsigovo — Town Museum of History 
 Chirpan — House Museum of Peyo Yavorov, Nikola Manev Art Gallery, St. Athanasius monastery in Zlatna Livada village. (The St. Sophia Temple formerly occupied this position.)
 Haskovo (added in the 2010s) – Virgin Mary monument, Aleksandrovo tomb and museum centre. (The Sofia Synagogue occupied this position prior to 2007.)72a. (added in the 2010s) Mezek – Medieval fortress, Thracian domed tomb. 72b. (added in the 2010s) Ivaylovgrad – Villa Armira, Municipal historical museum.
 Dimitrovgrad — History Museum, the House of Penyo Penev, Giordano Bruno observatory
 Vitosha (added in the 2010s) — Aleko Chalet. 74a. Cherni Vrah
 Koprivshtitsa — Archaeology and History Reserve
 Nova Zagora (added in the 2010s) – Karanova Mogila museum. (Bogdan Peak at Sredna Gora formerly occupied this position.)
 Klisura — Museum of History
 Osenovlag village — Seven Altars Monastery
 Samokov — Museum of History, the Nunnery. 79a. Belchin village (added in the 2010s) – Tsar Mali Town.
 Rila — Musala Peak
 Botevgrad — the Clocktower. (Slivnitsa town cemetery occupied this position prior to 2005.)
 Skravena village — monument at St. Nikolai Monastery to the members of Hristo Botev's detachment
 Smolyan — Museum of History. (Uhlovitsa Cave formerly occupied this position.)  83a. Smolyan Planetarium 83b. Momchilovtsi village
 Pamporovo — Uhlovitsa Cave, Snezhanka Peak
 Rhodope Mountains – Golyam Perelik Peak, The Wonderful Bridges
 Zlatograd — Ethnography Complex
 Rhodope Mountains – Shiroka Laka village archaeological reserve  87a. Madan, Smolyan Province – Rhodope Crystal Hall, Sharenka Cave
 Rhodope Mountains – Trigrad Gorge. (Formerly also: the Devil's Throat Cave)
 Rhodope Mountains – Yagodinska cave, Buynovo gorge
 Stara Zagora – the Neolithic Houses Museum, the Stara Zagora Defenders Memorial Complex, Museum of History. (Formerly also: the Roman Forum of Augusta Traiana)
 Kazanlak – Chudomir Art and Literature Museum, Thracian Tomb of Kazanlak
 Shipka town — Shipka Memorial Church
 Shipka Pass — Shipka Memorial
 Shumen — Shumen Fortress Historical and Archaeological Reserve, Founders of Bulgaria Monument, Regional Museum of History
 Shumen — Tombul Mosque
 Pliska — Archaeological Reserve Pliska, Great Basilica, Pliska
 Madara — Madara Rider
 Veliki Preslav – National Historical and Archaeological Reserve
 Yambol — the ancient town of Kabile,
Museum of History
 Elhovo — Museum of Ethnography

References

External links
Official website of the Bulgarian Tourist Union - 100 Sites (in Bulgarian)

Tourism in Bulgaria
Lists of tourist attractions in Bulgaria